The Wolfline is an area bus service serving the students, staff, faculty, and general public on and around North Carolina State University's campus in Raleigh, North Carolina. As of Fall 2017, Wolfline is operated by Transdev,
after being operated by First Transit between 2007 and 2017, under contract with NC State's Transportation department.
The Wolfline was the first mass transit organization in the state to exclusively use 'clean' diesel engines. Wolfline access is unrestricted to the public and is a zero-fare service. The preceding contractor was Veolia Transport. The Wolfline began operating in August 1980 with one route.

Currently, the Wolfline operates 11 routes on and between Main, Centennial, and the Veterinary School campuses. These routes often coincide with those operated by GoRaleigh and GoTriangle, facilitating movement about Raleigh, Cary, and the entire Research Triangle by bus.

Of the 11 campus-area routes, 3 run during weekdays and weekends, and 4 operate as daytime and nighttime routes, continuing past the 10:00 pm hour until 1:30 am or later. Over the summer, regular service is roughly cut in half.  During student breaks, the Wolfline runs limited service routes, focused on moving faculty and staff around. The Wolfline does not run on federal holidays.

After the beginning of the COVID-19 pandemic, Wolfline switched its routes significantly, changing its numbering to only include two digit route numbers, though many of the new routes resemble the pre-pandemic routes.

Routes 

 Rt. 20 Spring Hill, which connects both Main and Centennial Campuses to a park and ride lot in Spring Hill.
 Rt. 30 Main Campus East-West Connector, which connects Main Campus to Wolf Village and E.S. King Village.
 Rt. 40 Main-Centennial Express, which connects Central Campus with the College of Engineering buildings on Centennial Campus.
 Rt. 41 Main-Centennial Connector, which connects the Centennial, North, and Central campuses.
 Rt. 42 Centennial Campus Circulator, which connects Centennial Campus with apartments on Varsity Drive, Gorman Street, and Avent Ferry Road.
 Rt. 43 Village Link, which connects Wolf Village, E.S. King Village, Greek Village, and Centennial Campus.
 Rt. 50 Avent Ferry, which serves main campus, Avent Ferry Road, and Greek Way.
 Rt. 51 Varsity, which serves Main Campus, the McKimmon Center, the Varsity and West parking lots.
 Rt. 52 Gorman Street, which serves Main Campus, Avent Ferry Road, Gorman Street, and Varsity Drive
 Rt. 60 Carter Finley, which connects the D.H. Hill Library to the College of Veterinary Medicine at Centennial Biomedical Campus, Meredith College, Carter–Finley Stadium, and the Carter-Finley Park and Ride.
 RS Lot Shuttle, which operates from 6 PM to just after midnight, connecting a student resident storage parking lot to residential areas of NC State Campus.

See also

GoRaleigh
GoTriangle
Triangle Transit Authority

External links
Wolfline Route Information
NCSU Wolfline
NCSU Transportation
TransLoc TVS- Real-time bus locations

References

North Carolina State University
Bus transportation in North Carolina
University and college bus systems